Anwar Ahmed "Anu" Khan (24 September 1933 – 2 May 2014) was a Pakistani field hockey player who won one gold medal (in 1960 Summer Olympics at Rome) and two silver medals at the 1956–1964 Olympics, as well as gold medals at the Asian Games in 1958 and 1962. He is known as the Rock of Gibraltar.

Early life and career
Khan was born in India to His Highness Mohammad Hashim Khan and her Highness Noor Jehan begum, a fifth child among five brothers and one sister. He started playing hockey in India and continued after his family moved to Karachi, Pakistan, in 1950–51, becoming a national team member in 1954. He retired from competitions in 1966, and then until 1993 worked at the Pakistan Customs, where he was employed since 1955. In parallel, he assisted the Pakistan Hockey Federation as manager of senior and junior teams and member of selection committee. He helped the senior team to win a silver at the 1975 World Cup, a gold at the 1974 Asian Games, and a silver at the 1986 Asian Games, whereas the junior team won bronze at the 1982 World Cup.

Awards and recognition
 Tamgha-e-Imtiaz Award (Medal of Excellence Award) by the President of Pakistan

References

External links

1933 births
2014 deaths
Pakistani male field hockey players
Olympic field hockey players of Pakistan
Olympic gold medalists for Pakistan
Olympic silver medalists for Pakistan
Field hockey players at the 1956 Summer Olympics
Field hockey players at the 1960 Summer Olympics
Field hockey players at the 1964 Summer Olympics
Field hockey players from Bhopal
Indian emigrants to Pakistan
Muhajir people
Olympic medalists in field hockey
Asian Games medalists in field hockey
Field hockey players at the 1958 Asian Games
Field hockey players at the 1962 Asian Games
Medalists at the 1964 Summer Olympics
Medalists at the 1960 Summer Olympics
Medalists at the 1956 Summer Olympics
Asian Games gold medalists for Pakistan
Medalists at the 1958 Asian Games
Medalists at the 1962 Asian Games